The 1947 World Table Tennis Championships women's singles was the 14th edition of the women's singles championship.
Gizi Farkas defeated Elizabeth Blackbourn in the final by three sets to nil, to win the title.

Results

See also
 List of World Table Tennis Championships medalists

References

-
-